Llandudno Junction railway station is a station serving the village of Llandudno Junction on the Crewe to Holyhead North Wales Coast Line. The station is managed by Transport for Wales Rail, although Avanti West Coast also serves it.

It is a junction for trains to Llandudno and the Conwy Valley Line, and is one of the busiest stations in North Wales, surpassed only in passenger numbers by Bangor.

History
The original station (located to the west of the current station) was opened on 1 October 1858 and served the branch line to Llandudno. Built by the St. George's Harbour and Railway Company in 1858, this branch line heads north through Deganwy before terminating in the village. Before the completion of the junction station, the branch line trains from Llandudno ran through to Conwy.

This was followed by the opening of a second branch line in 1863 – the Conwy Valley Line – which headed south and was built by the Conway and Llanrwst Railway, and became part of the LNWR in 1867. It follows the valley of the River Conwy to Llanrwst (where it originally terminated) and Betws-y-Coed (a later terminus in 1869), then follows the Lledr Valley and a two mile long tunnel to terminate at Blaenau Ffestiniog, where passengers can join the Ffestiniog Railway.

Initially the Conwy Valley line ran into a separate platform on the south side of the station, and a refreshment room was built in 1864. But more space was needed to cope with both main line and branch-line traffic, and on 1 October 1897 the present station was opened on a much larger site, the two island platforms offering six through lines with two bays at each end (a total of four through platforms and four bay platforms). The opening of the new station allowed the demolition of the former station, but also entailed a diverting of the Conwy Valley branch, which now joined the main line some half a mile further east. The old formation was used to store locomotives.

Three of the platforms on the southern side (both bays and the down loop) were taken out of use in 1968 when the easternmost of the two signal boxes was closed and the track layout altered. In 1983 the branch junction was again moved slightly eastwards to allow a new freight terminal (now disused) to be built to replace the original goods yard and another at nearby Colwyn Bay that had been closed before the start of the A55 road widening scheme the previous year.

The station was also remodelled once more and resignalled at this time, and in 1985 a new power signal box was commissioned at the western end, which now controls the station area and junctions along with the main line between Colwyn Bay and Conwy and the northern end of the Conwy Valley branch (using the electric token system). The token machine for the branch is located at the station rather than in the signal box for operational convenience, allowing drivers to collect or return their token (with the cooperation of the signaller) whilst station work is undertaken, rather than having to make an additional stop at the box to make the exchange.

The station was also formerly the site of a motive power depot (which closed in 1966). It was given the code 7A by the London, Midland and Scottish Railway, which was altered to 6G by British Railways in March 1952. This had been located just south east of the station, and its site, together with the former adjoining goods yard, now have been redeveloped, but the new flyover road across the site bears the name 6G.

Layout

The station currently has four operational platforms:
Platform 1 is used by eastbound trains to Chester, Crewe, Birmingham New Street, Cardiff Central, London Euston and Blaenau Ffestiniog. It is also signalled for use by trains to Llandudno.
Platform 2 is a bay platform used by the hourly shuttle service to Llandudno. It is also used for stabling trains overnight.
Platform 3 is a bidirectional platform which can be used by all services. It is mainly used for westbound trains, but at busy periods can be used for eastbound trains as well.
Platform 4 is used by services to Bangor, Holyhead and Llandudno. It is also signalled for trains to Blaenau Ffestiniog (the first branch train of the day often leaves from here).

A bus shelter in the station car park is numbered as platform 5, and is used for local bus services as well as rail replacement services when the railway is closed for engineering work.

Facilities
The station is staffed throughout the day, with the ticket office on platforms 1 and 3. Self-service ticket machines are also available and for collecting pre-paid/advance purchase tickets. Other facilities on offer (all on platforms 1–3) include a waiting room, toilets, a cafe and public telephone.  Platform 4 has a canopy and customer help point only. Train running information is provided by poster boards, digital information screens and automated announcements. Step-free access is available from the station entrance to all platforms via lifts integrated into the main footbridge that links them.

Services

 Transport for Wales Rail provides an hourly service from either Birmingham International or Cardiff Central to Holyhead via Wrexham General, Shrewsbury, Chester and Bangor.
 Transport for Wales Rail provide an hourly service from Manchester Piccadilly to Llandudno. A few shuttle services between here and Llandudno also operate at certain times of day.
 Transport for Wales Rail operate six trains per day each way on the Conwy Valley Line to Blaenau Ffestiniog.
 Transport for Wales Rail operate one daily limited-stop Premier Service between Holyhead and Cardiff Central.
 Avanti West Coast operate four services each way to London Euston, plus a northbound only train between London and Bangor. They also operate two services per day each way between Crewe and Holyhead, plus two that run northbound only between Crewe and Bangor, and one of these trains extends to Holyhead. One northbound service from Crewe to Holyhead starts from Birmingham New Street. On Saturdays there are three southbound services per day to London Euston, as well as a daily southbound service which runs between Crewe and Holyhead, while northbound, there are two trains per day to Holyhead from London Euston and two trains to Holyhead from Crewe, plus another northbound service from Crewe which terminates here.

On Sundays services run hourly to Holyhead and Crewe (limited service to Cardiff Central and Birmingham International) on the main line, along with a half-hourly shuttle to Llandudno. There are also three trains each way to London Euston, operated by Avanti West Coast, who also operate one northbound train from Crewe to Holyhead. There are also four trains each way on the Blaenau Ffestiniog branch (these run all year since the winter 2019 timetable change).

During the 2020-21 COVID-19 pandemic, a reduced timetable has been in operation on the Coast line, with some services suspended and others reduced in frequency.

References

Further reading

External links

 Greatorme.org.uk, Llandudno Junction  and North Wales Train Services 1947 and 2003.
 6G Llandudno Junction, Loco shed 6G

Railway stations in Conwy County Borough
DfT Category C2 stations
Rail junctions in Wales
Former London and North Western Railway stations
Railway stations in Great Britain opened in 1858
Railway stations in Great Britain closed in 1897
Railway stations in Great Britain opened in 1897
Railway stations served by Transport for Wales Rail
Railway stations served by Avanti West Coast